Nancy "Nannie" Jones (January 8, 1860 - July 1939) was an African-American schoolteacher and missionary to Mozambique and Southern Rhodesia.

A native of Hopksinville, Kentucky, Jones moved with her family in childhood to Memphis, Tennessee, where she attended the Lemoyne Institute. She continued her education at Fisk University, from which she graduated in 1886; during her time there she worked as a student teacher in Alpika, Mississippi. She was a member of the First Colored Baptist Church in Memphis. Nevertheless she applied to the American Board of Commissioners for Foreign Missions, a Congregationalist organization, for a missionary posting, and in 1888 was sent to work in Mozambique, becoming in the process the first unmarried black woman commissioned by the Board. She was sent to Kambini, in the Inhambane region, where she worked alongside two other black missionaries, Benjamin and Henrietta Bailey Ousley. Initially a teacher of the primary grades at the village school, she soon took charge of the operations of that division; she also visited areas nearby, eventually opening a school for children from other villages.

In 1893 Jones was sent to the Gaza mission in Southern Rhodesia, at first working again as a teacher in the local school. She was removed from this post, however, and relegated to menial housekeeping tasks; furthermore, her fellow missionaries refused to share housing with her. Citing this prejudice as a reason, she resigned from the mission in 1887 and returned to Memphis, where she continued her teaching career. Accompanying her was an African girl named Mary Jones (born 1883) whose status is unknown; she may have been Nancy's adopted daughter. For a time she taught in DeSoto County, Mississippi. Eventually she moved to Tunica County in the same state, where with the assistance of David Reid she established the Colored Normal, Industrial and Mechanical School of Tunica near Prichard in 1920. Jones continued living in Mississippi until her death; she was interred at Belmont Baptist Church near Prichard.

References

1860 births
1939 deaths
People from Hopkinsville, Kentucky
People from Memphis, Tennessee
People from Tunica County, Mississippi
Schoolteachers from Kentucky
Schoolteachers from Tennessee
Schoolteachers from Mississippi
Baptists from Kentucky
Baptists from Tennessee
Baptists from Mississippi
19th-century American educators
19th-century American women educators
20th-century American educators
20th-century American women educators
Baptist missionaries in Mozambique
Baptist missionaries in Zimbabwe
Baptist missionaries from the United States
LeMoyne–Owen College alumni
Fisk University alumni
African-American missionaries
Female Christian missionaries
20th-century African-American women
20th-century African-American people
20th-century African-American educators